Ecaterina Cocuța Conachi (2 April 1829 – 22 February 1870) was a Romanian princess and revolutionary. She is known for her activism and work for the unification of Moldavia and Wallachia.

She belonged to the Conachi family. Ecaterina Conachi married firstly in 1846, in Iași, Prince Nicolae Vogoride. They had four children. In 1864, she remarried in Rome, Prince Emanuele Ruspoli, with whom she had five children, among them Eugenio Ruspoli (Țigănești – , Somalia) and Mario Ruspoli (Țigănești – , Florence).

She died of paludism.

References

External links
George Marcu (coord.), Enciclopedia personalităţilor feminine din România, Editura Meronia, București, 2012.
Ecaterina Conachi a salvat Unirea Principatelor Române împiedicându-şi soţul să devină domnitor at adevarul.ro
Copoul poetului Costache Conachi  at ziarullumina.ro

1828 births
1870 deaths
People from Munteni
19th-century Romanian people
Conachi family
Deaths from malaria
19th-century Romanian women
Female revolutionaries